Dhavdi is a Hindu Goddess. There is a temple dedicated to Maa (Mother) Dhavdi in Dhrangadhra, Gujarat. Rhinoceros is her Vahana.

She is depicted with four arms, carrying Trishula , sword,  Scimitar and the last hand as Abhaya mudra.

References

Hindu goddesses